Colm Ó Snodaigh (born 22 May 1966) is a member of the traditional Irish folk group Kíla. He is also a writer and a former sportsman, winning honours in football, hurling and tennis.

Personal life

Ó Snodaigh was born in Dublin and reared on the south side of Dublin near Sandymount village; he is a native Irish speaker and was educated in the language at local Gaelscoileanna: Scoil Lorcáin and Coláiste Eoin. He completed a degree in Physiotherapy (BPhysio) at University College Dublin in 1988.

He is the son of Irish-language publisher and author Pádraig Ó Snodaigh and artist Cliodhna Cussen. His brothers are Fergus, Aengus, Cormac, Rónán and Rossa. His great uncle Dennis Cussen ran in the 1928 Amsterdam Olympics, in the 100 yards competition, held the world record for fastest time over 100 yards on grass for a time and also played rugby for Ireland 15 times scoring a famous hat-trick of tries against England in 1926.

He is married to Lizbeth Goodman, Chair of Creative Technology Innovation and Inclusive Design for Education at UCD and founder/director of SMARTlab: a native New Yorker. Their son, Lúcas Alan Goodman- Ó Snodaigh, is thriving at primary school near the seaside in Bray surrounded by the Irish language, music, art, sports, poetry, family and friends. The family maintain close ties with family and friends in New York as well.

Music
Ó Snodaigh plays the flute, tin whistle, guitar, saxophone and percussion. He plays and sings with the group Kíla and also released two solo albums titled  in 1990 and Giving in 2007. While  featured Colm's songs in Irish and accompanied by Kíla's musicians and friends, Giving saw him branch out with songs in English, with production by Shay Fitzgerald and accompaniment by various other musicians. He is currently working on his follow-up to Giving.

Writing
Ó Snodaigh has written one book of short stories entitled  (Tripping/Touring) which was published in 1995 by Coiscéim. His début novella Pat the Pipe –  was published in 2007 and was turned into a radio drama for Raidió na Life by his brother Rossa. He translated Sandy Fitzgerald's children's story  (Cale & the Blue Boy) which was published in early 2008. He wrote a monthly article on music for online magazine Beo.ie from 2006 to 2011 and these articles formed the basis of a collection of essays on music in a book called  (2013). One of the articles  was included in the New Island publication Sunday Miscellany – A Selection from 2006 to 2008 following its broadcast in 2008 on RTÉ Radio 1. This same article was included, along with a sister article , as a tribute to Pádraig Ó Cléirigh, in a posthumous collection of Pádraig's short stories published by Coiscéím in 2010, entitled . For his 2017 book, he researched the campaign of civil disobedience in the west Kerry Gaeltacht to keep the  primary school open against the will of the then-Fianna Fáil government.

Sport

Football
After periods with Shamrock Rovers, Shelbourne and University College Dublin A.F.C., Ó Snodaigh was a squad member of the successful Bray Wanderers side that won the 1989–90 FAI Cup in at Lansdowne Road with a 3–0 victory against St Francis, lost in the European Cup Winners Cup tie against Trabzonspor, and finished runners-up in the 1990–91 League of Ireland First Division.  That same year he was a central member of Wanderers reserve side that finished runners-up in the League of Ireland B Division. He won the B team player of the year award in 1990 and was a member of the first team that lost the LFA President's Cup final 3–1 against Dundalk.

In time, he left Bray and became a member of Leinster Senior League side Pegasus where, over a seven-year period, he was a member of their FAI Intermediate Cup winning team in 1992 against Bluebell United, top scorer in 1996/7, selected for the Leinster Senior League selection team in 1992, was captain of the side that got relegated from the senior division in 1997 following a defeat away to Bluebell and played in every position for the side except goalkeeper.

Hurling
Following retirement from soccer, due largely to a serious knee injury, Ó Snodaigh, at the behest of his brother, Rossa, joined the St Kevin's Junior C hurling team. In two seasons, he helped them win the Junior C Dublin Shield twice and the league once. In his second season, he scored many goals. He mostly played at right or left full forward.

Tennis
He played tennis for twenty years at the Sandymount tennis club, Claremont and latterly Claremont/Railway Union. He played Class 2 for the senior team, in the summer league and won the U19 singles title.

References

External links
Biography on Kila's website
Interview on Beat 102/103 FM 2007

Irish male singer-songwriters
Living people
Musicians from County Dublin
Leinster Senior League (association football) players
Bray Wanderers F.C. players
Shamrock Rovers F.C. players
Shelbourne F.C. players
University College Dublin A.F.C. players
League of Ireland players
Republic of Ireland association footballers
Association footballers from County Dublin
1966 births
Association footballers not categorized by position

ga:Kíla